Satellite Beach is a coastal city in Brevard County, Florida, U.S. The population was 11,346 at the 2020 United States Census, and it is located with the Atlantic Ocean to the east and the Indian River to the west.

Satellite Beach is part of the Palm Bay–Melbourne–Titusville Metropolitan Statistical Area.

Geography

Satellite Beach is located at  (28.173441, –80.596674).

The Atlantic Ocean forms its eastern border; the Indian River the western border. It is located on the local barrier island directly south of Patrick Space Force Base. It is part of the South Beaches.

With both ocean and river frontage, the city is the largest beachside community in South Brevard County.

Climate

Satellite Beach is located in the region where tropical and temperate climatic zones overlap. A study commissioned by NASA lends credence to the perception that Satellite Beach is located in a portion of the North American Atlantic shoreline with a reduced incidence of catastrophic hurricanes.

Fauna

Threatened Atlantic loggerhead sea turtles nest on the city's ocean beaches at densities of approximately one nest per  of shoreline per year. Endangered green sea turtles also deposit nests along the city's ocean beach each year.

Endangered North Atlantic right whales calve off the city's shoreline. Endangered West Indian manatees frequent the city's canals and the Banana River. Bald eagles forage over Samsons Island.

The  of wetland created as mitigation by a local developer on Samsons Island provide nutrient-rich, sheltered aquatic habitat serving as finfish nursery and feeding ground for a diverse assemblage of birds and mammals. The city established Samsons Island Nature Park, the only gopher tortoise relocation recipient site on the barrier island.  It is occupied by 42 relocated tortoises and three which had been living on the island when development began.  The city has erected five osprey nesting platforms on Samsons Island Nature Park, from which young have been fledged.

Efforts are now under way to create habitat for use by gopher tortoises and scrub jays. Xeric scrub around the local county library, until the late 1990s, hosted a family of threatened Florida scrub jays.

The city is working with faculty of the Florida Institute of Technology to promote graduate student research and class projects on Samsons Island Nature Park and to assist in devising and implementing maintenance programs to preserve and enhance desirable wildlife habitats.

The city has approved the use of inland dirt-officially called upland sources-to be used in beach nourishment projects. These projects will bury part of a natural reef. After three projects, the sea shells are gone, and turtle nesting declined significantly in the years following this nourishment.

Flora

Due to the moderating influence of surrounding water bodies, the climate on the barrier island supports tropical species of plants normally found far to the south.  Brevard County's barrier island to, approximately, Cape Canaveral, constitutes the northernmost limit of the range of many of these plant species.  At the same time, the infrequency and mildness of freezes in the Central Florida region serves to define the southern limit of many plants found in temperate zones. Vegetated sand dunes are found along most of the beach's length and provide the major defense against storm events. Native plant species found on the dunes include sea oats, Sabal palmetto, sea grape, railroad vine, dollar weed, coral bean, Spanish bayonet, wax myrtle, yaupon holly, and several grass species. More salt-tolerant and wind-tolerant species, such as sea oats and railroad vine, are found predominantly on the ocean side of the dune, while other dune vegetation species do not generally show such zonation.  These plants assist in building the dune by trapping windblown sand and in stabilizing the dune with extensive lateral root systems.

Geology

The National Marine Fisheries Service has classified the rock as an Essential Fish Habitat-Habitat Area of Particular Concern. It is important to aquatic life and found only in a few locations along the Eastern seaboard.

On the city's ocean beach can be found fossil Atlantic ghost crabs, the remnants of a unique set of geological circumstances which preserved these creatures when they died in their burrows perhaps about 110,000 years ago.

There are significant deposits of sand, marl, coquina and possibly phosphate within the city limits.

Surrounding areas

History

Satellite Beach became incorporated in 1957 by Percy L. Hedgecock and his brothers, B.D.(Shine) and Herbert(Hub) Hedgecock, along with cousins, Jimmy Caudle and Dumont Smith.  Hedgecock also served as the town's first mayor from 1957 until 1973.

Volunteers have provided more than 10,000 hours each year to youth and public service programs.

Sometime around 2001, Christina Freeman, also known as Nikki Freeman, became the youngest elected Mayor of Satellite Beach, FL. She instituted new legislation like: No Work Wednesdays (no one works), Coffee is Free on Friday (coffee is free, everywhere) and no one has to smile Saturdays (no one has to smile, unless they really want to). She is now in Austin, TX working in marketing but comes back every so often to enforce and participate in no smile Saturdays. She has a brother named Sean Freeman who is the mascot of Satellite Beach (he dresses up as himself) and her parents, George Jr. and Sheila Freeman run the chill, beach and party operations of the town.

In 2010, the city began planning for a rise in sea level resulting from climate change.

In 2011, the city became one of the first areas in the United States to install solar panels on municipal buildings.

In 2013, the city announced that it would undertake $36 million worth of work to restore beach areas and dunes along the coast, to areas battered by hurricanes in 2004. The project was underwritten by Brevard County and the Florida Department of Environmental Protection.

On December 4, 2013, there was a parade in celebration of the Jewish holiday of Hanukkah. There were one hundred Menorah-topped vehicles, a Menorah lighting, free food (including traditional Latkes), and live entertainment.

The annual Ocean, Reef and Beach Festival is organized by the Surfrider Foundation, Pure Ocean TV Productions and Anglers for Conservation.

The Banana River Sail and Power Squadron sponsors the annual Holiday Boat Parade.

On December 20, 2013, the city announced plans to build a beachside trail that would allow people to walk, jog and cycle along the coast. The proposed trail would run along the dunes south from Fischer Park. The beachside trail would hook up to the proposed  "A1A Urban Trail."

In the summer of 2018 Erin Brockovich hosted a town hall to address citizens concerns that ground contamination from an old military dump was causing increased rates of cancer. Those concerns were validated when County health officials released a report the following summer that showed a higher incidence of some rare cancers and again when the U.S. Department of Defense designated an area just blocks north of the city as a “Formerly Used Defense Site” While no direct link between the cancer cases and contamination has been established as of January 2020, officials and activists are still working on the issue. What prompted a renewed interest in this issue was when an oncologist who graduated from Satellite High School in 2003 noticed that an unusually high number of her classmates were getting cancer and dying.

Demographics

As of the census of 2000, there were 9,577 people, 3,952 households, and 2,877 families residing in the city. The racial makeup of the city was 94.99% White, 1.02% African American, 0.18% Native American, 1.55% Asian, 0.03% Pacific Islander, 0.67% from other races, and 1.57% from two or more races. Hispanic or Latino people of any race were 2.95% of the population. Of the city's 7,444 residents who are 25 or older, approximately one in five hold a graduate or professional degree.

The only traditional Jewish synagogue, Chabad of the Space & Treasure Coasts, along the Brevard County coastline is in the city.

There were 3,952 households, out of which 26.8% had children under 18 living with them, 60.3% were married couples living together, 9.2% had a female householder with no husband present, and 27.2% were non-families. 22.5% of all households were made up of individuals, and 10.7% had someone living alone who was 65 years of age or older. The average household size was 2.42 and the average family size was 2.83.

In the city, the population was distributed by age groups as follows: 21.8% under the age of 18, 5.3% from 18 to 24, 23.0% from 25 to 44, 28.3% from 45 to 64, and 21.5% who were 65 years of age or older. The median age was 45 years. For every 100 females, there were 95.0 males. For every 100 females age 18 and over, there were 92.3 males.

Government
In 2007, the city had a taxable real estate base of $877.12 million.

The city maintains an active list of about 80 volunteers ("Neighbor Helping Neighbor" program) who helps out where requested, often senior citizens, whose mobility is impaired.

Education
The city has the following schools:

Public schools:
DeLaura Middle School
Satellite High School
Holland Elementary
Surfside Elementary
Seapark Elementary
Private schools:
Chabad Hebrew School
Coastal Community School
Torah Academy Preschool

Recreation

The city has several parks, recreational facilities and natural landscapes, however in recent years the lagoon has been severely degraded by recurring algae blooms.<ref></</ref>

In 2013, Hightower Beach Park was renovated by a community partnership with Montecito Community Development District and state funds from the Florida Preservation 2000 and Florida Land and Water grant programs. The  park contains the natural dune system and has a boardwalk along the coastline. Surfers use the beach.

RC's Beach and Buccaneer Beach are named for a former Royal Castle hamburger kiosk and the Buccaneer Condos, respectively. They are used for surfing.

The David R. Schechter Community Center is a recreational community center. It hosts gatherings, community special events, classes, programs, and other activities.

Pelican Beach Park was renovated in 2007. During the summer months, the Sea Turtle Preservation Society conducts weekly sea turtle tours. The north dune crossover is called "Pelican" by the local surfers.

The DeSoto Recreation Complex features eight tennis courts as well as two enclosed racquetball courts.

Samsons Island is a  park. It was renovated from an island overrun with exotic plants. Volunteers have worked since 1991 to develop it. It is only accessible by boat. There are butterflies, gopher tortoises, armadillos, squirrels and snakes—black racers and coachwhips. There are 30 species of birds. The island contains trails, bird watching, camping areas, wildlife, and picnic areas. Samsons Island has trails for biking and hiking. There is canal dredging taking place to remove potentially toxic muck.

The Satellite Beach Sports and Recreation Park contains . It has a walking trail, skate park, dog park, frisbee fields, soccer fields and volleyball courts.

Gemini Beach Park is a  park nestled between Ellwood and Park Avenue and contains dunes, sea turtles, and birdlife.

Economy

Personal income
In 2011, the median income for a household in the city was $60,870, and median family income was $75,159. 25% of households and 32% of families made more than $100,000. Males had a median income of $42,079 versus $28,259 for females. The per capita income for the city was $27,181.  About 2.7% of families and 4.5% of the population were below the poverty line, including 4.2% of those under age 18 and 4.8% of those age 65 or over.

In 2020, the median income for a household in the city was $79,082. The per capita income of all residents for the city was $41,566. About 4.9% of the population was reported to be below the poverty line.

Industry
Satellite Beach Technology Company designs and develops biometric security systems. This industry generates approximately $1.5 billion revenue each year.

A company Lighting Sciences Group manufactures LED light bulbs locally. It employs 400 people. The company was recently featured in Deloitte's Technology Fast 500, a ranking of the 500 fastest growing technology, media, telecommunications, life sciences and clean technology companies in North America.

Satellite Beach Library 
During the 1960s, Brevard county's population soared due to the Aerospace program and the demands on libraries increased, resulting in the need for more branches. There were many members of the community that expressed the need for a branch in Satellite Beach. A site was selected by the City of Satellite Beach on Cassia Boulevard. A head librarian was selected to run the branch with a volunteer staff. The library's initial budget was $50,000. The Satellite Beach Public Library opened on April 17, 1966. The location eventually outgrew the initial building. In 1991 a new 19,000 square foot facility was completed for the Satellite Beach Public Library at the site of the old Indian Harbor Beach Sewer Treatment Plant property. The land was purchased by the County at a cost of $75,000 and increased the size of the library from 6,500 square feet to 19,000 square feet. The new facility opened on September 23, 1991 on Jamaica Boulevard.

At this time, there were 18,266 registered patrons with a monthly circulation averaging 22,000. There are approximately 63,891 volumes in the book collection of fiction, non-fiction, and reference. There are 2,200 recordings and cassettes and 1269 video tapes. A collection of compact discs have also been added. The new facility offers a Community Meeting Room, children's area and young adult section, study rooms, and public typewriter.

Infrastructure

Roads

Travelocity.com named route A1A as the "Best Driving Route" in Florida. This runs close to the ocean. A secondary major route, paralleling it, is South Patrick Drive, which is close to the Banana River.

The Florida Department of Transportation maintains 513, and A1A.

See State Roads in Florida for explanation of numbering system.

  SR A1A – The main road through Satellite Beach. There is no local name. The major east–west road, Cassia Bouelvard, intersects both it and SR 513.
  SR 513 – Known locally as South Patrick Drive, this is a parallel route to SR A1A.

Canals

There are several canals that connect the city to the Indian River Lagoon, including: The Grand Canal, the canal paralleling Desoto Parkway, and the Anchor Drive Canal.

Beach ‘Nourishment’

Every five years Brevard County conduct a dune renourishment project on the beach in an effort to preserve the natural coastline.  ” While proponents of beach renourishment defend the action as a way to preserve the natural coastline, prevent coastal armoring of properties, and protect natural sea turtle nesting habitat; some residents who oppose it say it's wasteful and ruins the quality of the beach.

Notable people

 Buzz Aldrin, Apollo 11 astronaut, currently still resides in Satellite Beach
 John Antoon, United States District Court judge
 LtGen Alexander R. Bolling, commander of the 84th Infantry Division in World War II and later commander of the Third Army
 David Max Eichhorn, Jewish philosopher, contributing author to Encyclopædia Britannica, Chaplain in the US Army whose company liberated Dachau concentration camp. Resided in Satellite Beach
 Larry Guarino, spent eight years as a POW in the Hanoi Hilton during the Vietnam War
 Ashlyn Harris, goalkeeper for the USWNT and the Orlando Pride
 C. J. Hobgood, 2001 ASP World Champion Surfer 
 Damien Hobgood, professional surfer
 Younghill Kang, novelist; passed away here on December 14, 1972
 Kelly Kretschman, USA Women's Softball Team gold medalist 
 Nicholas Lindheim, professional golfer
 Ryan Ludwick, left fielder for Cincinnati Reds baseball team; born here on July 13, 1978
 Jefferson W. Speck, Arkansas politician and World War II prisoner of war, resided in Satellite Beach in the early 1970s
 Thomas P. Stafford, Apollo 10 astronaut
 Leonard Weaver, fullback for Philadelphia Eagles; played football at Satellite High School

References

External links

History of Satellite Beach video, part 1

 
Cities in Brevard County, Florida
Cities in Florida
Populated coastal places in Florida on the Atlantic Ocean
Beaches of Brevard County, Florida
Beaches of Florida